Enes Novinić (born 18 July 1985, in Čakovec) is a Croatian footballer who plays as a forward for NK Karlovac.

Club career
A product of Prva HNL side Varteks' youth academy, Novinić was promoted to their first team squad in July 2003. He soon established himself as a regular member of the club's starting lineup and appeared in a total of 104 league matches. He scored 25 goals for Varteks before leaving the club in the 2009 summer transfer window and joining the newly promoted Karlovac on a free transfer.

During his time at Varteks, Novinić helped the club reach the Croatian Cup Finals twice, in the 2003–04 and 2005–06 seasons, and was the club's top league scorer in the 2006–07 season.

International career
Novinić was also capped for Croatia at youth levels, scoring a total of 7 goals in 14 international matches between 2003 and 2004.

References

External links
 
Enes Novinić at 1hnl.net 
Enes Novinić at Sportnet.hr 

1985 births
Living people
Sportspeople from Čakovec
Association football forwards
Croatian footballers
Croatia youth international footballers
NK Varaždin players
NK Karlovac players
NK Krka players
NK Slaven Belupo players
HNK Segesta players
Croatian Football League players
2. Liga (Austria) players
Slovenian PrvaLiga players
Croatian expatriate footballers
Expatriate footballers in Austria
Croatian expatriate sportspeople in Austria
Expatriate footballers in Slovenia
Croatian expatriate sportspeople in Slovenia